Alternaria panax is a fungal plant pathogen, which causes Alternaria blight of ginseng.

References

panax
Fungal plant pathogens and diseases
Food plant pathogens and diseases
Eudicot diseases
Fungi described in 1912